Ogiwara (written: 荻原) is a Japanese surname. Notable people with the surname include:

, Japanese boxer
, Japanese Nordic combined skier and politician
, Japanese writer
, Japanese sculptor
, pen-name of Ogiwara Tōkichi, Japanese poet
, Japanese footballer
, Japanese Nordic combined skier

See also
7955 Ogiwara, a main-belt asteroid

Japanese-language surnames